Benjamin Disraeli (1804–1881) was a British politician and writer who twice served as Prime Minister of the United Kingdom.

Disraeli or D'Israeli may also refer to:

Arts and entertainment
 Disraeli (play), a 1911 play by Louis N. Parker
 Disraeli (1916 film), a silent film by Charles Calvert
 Disraeli (1921 film), a silent film starring George Arliss 
 Disraeli (1929 film), a film starring George Arliss 
 Disraeli (TV serial), a 1978 British miniseries

Places
 Disraeli, Quebec (city), Canada
 Disraeli, Quebec (parish), Canada
 Disraeli Glacier, Nunavut, Canada
 County of Disraeli, a cadastral unit in the Northern Territory of Australia

People
 Benjamin D'Israeli (merchant) (1730–1816), British financier and merchant
 Coningsby Disraeli (1867–1936), British politician
 Isaac D'Israeli (1766–1848), British writer, scholar and man of letters; father of Benjamin Disraeli
 Mary Anne Disraeli (1792–1872), British peeress, wife of Benjamin Disraeli
 Disraeli Lufadeju (born 1992), English basketball player
 D'Israeli (cartoonist), pseudonym of British cartoonist Matt Brooker

Other uses
 Disraeli (horse), a British Thoroughbred racehorse
 Disraeli Freeway, another name for part of Winnipeg Route 42, a major Canadian road

See also
 
 Dizraeli, stage name of British rapper Rowan Alexander Sawday

Jewish surnames
Yiddish-language surnames